WASP-39b, officially named  Bocaprins, is a "hot Jupiter" extrasolar planet discovered in February 2011 by the WASP project, notable for containing a substantial amount of water in its atmosphere. In addition WASP-39b was the first exoplanet found to contain carbon dioxide and in its atmosphere, and likewise for sulfur dioxide.

WASP-39b is in the constellation Virgo, and is about 700 light-years from Earth. As part of the NameExoWorlds campaigns at the 100th anniversary of the IAU, the planet was named Bocaprins, after the beach  in the Arikok National Park of Aruba.

Characteristics

WASP-39b has a mass of about 0.28 times that of Jupiter and a radius about 1.27 times that of Jupiter (91,000 km). It is a hot gas giant planet with a high temperature of 900 °C. The exoplanet orbits very close (7 million km) to WASP-39, its host star, every 4 days. 

WASP-39b is also notable for having an extremely low density, near that of WASP-17b. While WASP-17b has a density of  g/cm3, WASP-39b has a slightly higher density of  g/cm3.

Atmospheric composition

Hot water molecules were found in the atmosphere of WASP-39b in a 2018 study. The atmospheric transmission spectra, taken by different instruments, were inconsistent as in 2021, possibly indicating a disequilibrium atmospheric chemistry. High-fidelity spectra obtained by the James Webb Space Telescope in 2022 did not confirm a disequilibrium chemistry.

WASP-39b is one of the James Webb Space Telescope's early release science targets. Sulfur dioxide was observed in this planet's atmosphere for the first time, or indeed of any planet outside of the Solar System, indicating the existence of  photochemical processes in the atmosphere. WASP-39b is the first exoplanet in which carbon dioxide has been detected.

Planetary transmission spectra taken in 2022 has indicated the atmosphere of WASP-39b is partially cloudy, and planet C/O ratio appears to be subsolar. The spectral signature of water, carbon dioxide, sodium and sulfur dioxide were also detected.

WASP-39 (star)

The parent star WASP-39 is of spectral class G and is slightly smaller than the Sun. It lies in the Virgo constellation, 698 light-years from Earth.  The star WASP-39 was named Malmok.

See also
 WASP-6b
 WASP-17b
 WASP-19b
 WASP-31b
 WASP-121b
 List of proper names of exoplanets (see section Sources in References)
 List of transiting exoplanets
 List of exoplanets discovered in 2011

References

External links

Exoplanets discovered by WASP
Exoplanets discovered in 2011
Giant planets
Hot Jupiters
Exoplanets with proper names